Victoria Penelope Jane Ward (born 3 July 1969) is a British-born American author, investigative journalist, editor-at-large, and television commentator. She was a Senior Reporter at CNN and a former magazine and newspaper editor who has featured in The New York Times Best Seller list.

Early life and education

Vicky Ward was born Victoria Penelope Jane Ward on 3 July 1969 in Chelmsford, Essex. She is the daughter of Simon Charles Ward, a retired London financier, and Myrtle Ward (née East), a graduate of the University of Dublin. She has two younger sisters, Antonia Ward and Lucinda Ward. Ward attended Benenden School from 1983–1987 and later earned a BA and MA in English literature from Trinity Hall, University of Cambridge during 1988–1991.

Career

Prior to moving to the U.S. in 1997, Ward was a columnist and feature writer for The Independent, a British newspaper. In New York City, she was the features and news features editor of the New York Post (1999–2001) and Tina Brown's executive editor at Talk (2000–2001).

Ward worked as a contributing editor to Vanity Fair (2001–2012) as well as a columnist for the London Evening Standard (2007–2011). Her Vanity Fair articles covered a wide array of subject matter: politics, finance, art, and culture and society. Among other things, she wrote about Hewlett Packard, Morgan Stanley, Bruce Wasserstein, a failed coup in Africa, Kate Middleton, Valerie Plame, counter-terrorist czar Dick Clarke, Brooke Astor, Veronica Hearst, the Guggenheim, the Getty, Phillips de Pury Luxembourg, St. Barths, Vivendi, Jeffrey Epstein, Washington interns, the Fairfield Greenwich hedge fund and Bernie Madoff.

From July 2017 to July 2019, Ward served as editor-at-large for HuffPost and Huffington Post Highline, their long-form magazine. HuffPost exclusives written by Ward included interviews with Blackwater's Erik Prince, Trump's former lawyer Michael Cohen, and Anthony Scaramucci on the White House and why he was fired. For The Huffington Post Highline, Ward wrote articles about Vice President Mike Pence's Chief of Staff, Nick Ayers and Robert and Rebekah Mercer's influence in the 2016 election. Charlie Rose later interviewed her on this piece.

In July 2019, Ward was named Senior Reporter at CNN. For CNN, her reporting included pieces on the rise of the Jeffrey Epstein mystique, the scrutiny of Trump campaign manager Brad Parscale's business ties, and a look at Donald Trump's ongoing fight to keep his tax returns private.

Ward is also editor-at-large at Town & Country magazine, where she writes about culture. Her pieces have included an article on the late, seminal Russian art collector Sergei Shchukin, Frank Gehry's first-ever sailboat design, and a $2 billion fraud in the modern art world including the Knoedler art trial.

In 2016, Ward wrote investigative long-form articles for Esquire including a profile of the Russian-born cyber-terrorism expert Dmitri Alperovitch, and a piece on senior presidential aide Jared Kushner,  about whom she later, in 2019, wrote a book.

Ward has contributed to, among others, the Financial Times, The New York Times, the London Times, Sunday Times, Daily Telegraph, the UK Spectator magazine, British Vogue, US Harper's Bazaar and Porter. She has also had on-air contracts with CNBC and Bloomberg TV. She appears regularly on MSNBC's Morning Joe.

Ward is the author of three books: the New York Times bestseller The Devil's Casino in 2010, The Liar's Ball in 2014, and the New York Times bestseller Kushner, Inc.: Greed. Ambition. Corruption. in 2019. Centering on the story of real estate developer Harry Macklowe, The Liar's Ball was reported to be in development as a feature film by J.C. Chandor and A24 Productions.

Ward appeared in the 2017 documentary film Blurred Lines: Inside the Art World.

In 2019, Ward said her 2003 profile of Jeffrey Epstein in Vanity Fair had included on-the-record accounts of Annie and Maria Farmer (who filed the earliest known criminal complaints about Epstein), but that they were later stricken from Ward's article after Epstein pressured the magazine's editor Graydon Carter. While researching Epstein, Ward was pregnant with twins and reported that she felt compelled to hire security protection for their neonatal intensive care unit after Epstein had threatened their wellbeing.

In June 2020, she joined the Council on Foreign Relations As of summer 2020, she was at work on her fourth book. She is the host and producer of Chasing Ghislaine, which was released July 15, 2021 as an Audible Original podcast (and hit #5 on Audible's Weekly Bestsellers List) and as docuseries premiering on discovery+ on November 22, 2021 and ID on December 3, 2021. On November 29, 2021, she launched the Substack newsletter "Vicky Ward Investigates".

Bibliography

 2010 The Devil's Casino: Friendship, Betrayal and the High Stakes Games Played Inside Lehman Brothers, Wiley, 
 2014 The Liar's Ball: The Extraordinary Saga of How one Building Broke the World's Toughest Tycoons, Wiley, 
 2019 Kushner, Inc.: Greed. Ambition. Corruption. The Extraordinary Story of Jared Kushner and Ivanka Trump, St. Martin's Press, New York,

Personal life

Ward met Matthew Doull in the 1990s when both were working at The Daily Telegraph. They married in July 1995 and have two children together, twins Orlando and Lorcán, born in early 2003. Ward and Doull later divorced. Ward has lived in New York City since 1997, and is a naturalized U.S. citizen as of 2017.

A portrait of Ward, taken by photographer Jason Bell, was exhibited in the British National Portrait Gallery in 2011 as part of Bell's series "An Englishman in New York". The series, including the portrait of Ward, was also published as a book by the same title.

References

Further reading

 Ward, Vicky. "The Talented Mr. Epstein" Vanity Fair, 2003
 Ward, Vicky. "I Tried to Warn You About Sleazy Billionaire Jeffrey Epstein in 2003" The Daily Beast, 2015
 Ward, Vicky. "Jeffrey Epstein's Sick Story Played Out for Years in Plain Sight" The Daily Beast, 2019
Ward, Vicky.

External links
 VickyWard.com

 
Living people
British investigative journalists
Alumni of Trinity Hall, Cambridge
British emigrants to the United States
1969 births
Vanity Fair (magazine) people
People from Chelmsford
CNN people
Naturalized citizens of the United States
20th-century British journalists
20th-century British women writers
20th-century American journalists
20th-century American women writers
21st-century American journalists
21st-century American non-fiction writers
21st-century American women writers
British women journalists
American women journalists
American women non-fiction writers
Writers from Essex